Merald Woodlow "Bubba" Knight, Jr. (born September 4, 1942) is an American R&B/soul singer, best known as a member of Gladys Knight & the Pips. The older brother of lead singer Gladys Knight, Bubba Knight served as the unofficial leader of the family group, and was instrumental in handling the Pips' business matters. "Gladys Knight & The Pips" evolved out of The Pips.

The original Pips formed in Atlanta in 1952, with Gladys, Bubba, sister Brenda, plus cousins Eleanor and William Guest singing supper-club material during the week, and gospel music on Sundays.  Knight is a multiple Grammy Award winner, and he was inducted to the Rock and Roll Hall of Fame with Gladys Knight & the Pips in 1996.

References

External links
Bubba Knight video interview on Talktails

1942 births
Living people
Musicians from Atlanta
American soul musicians
Gladys Knight & the Pips members
Knight family (show business)
20th-century African-American male singers
American soul singers
American rhythm and blues singers
American male dancers
American businesspeople
African-American businesspeople
Singers from Georgia (U.S. state)
21st-century African-American people